The gardens of ancient Egypt probably began as simple fruit orchards and vegetable gardens, irrigated with water from the Nile. Gradually as the country became richer, they evolved into pleasure gardens with flowers, ponds and valleys of fruit and shade trees. Temples, palaces, and private residences had their own gardens, and models of gardens were sometimes placed in tombs so their owners could enjoy them in their afterlife.

History
The history and character of gardens in ancient Egypt, like all aspects of Egyptian life,  depended upon the Nile, and the network of canals that drew water from it.   Water was hoisted from the Nile in leather buckets and carried on the shoulders to the gardens, and later,  beginning in about the 4th century B.C., lifted from wells by hoists with counterbalancing weights called shadouf in Arabic.  The earliest gardens were composed of planting beds divided into squares by earthen walls, so the water could soak into the soil rather than be lost.
Gardens belonged to temples or the residences.    Secular gardens were located near the river or canals and were used mainly for growing vegetables. Beginning during the New Kingdom, gardens were attached to more luxurious residences and were sometimes enclosed by walls.  Temple gardens were used to raise certain vegetables for ceremonies.

Palace gardens
Palace gardens first appeared in Egypt just before the Middle Empire (2035–1668). These gardens were very large in scale, and were laid out in geometric patterns. The ponds of palace gardens were enormous and numerous. In the second millennium BC, the garden pond of King Sneferu was large enough for boats rowed by twenty oarsmen.

The rulers of ancient Egypt, such as Queen Hatshepsut (1503–1482 BC)  and Ramses III (1198–1166 BC), used pots to bring back to Egypt new kinds of trees and flowers discovered during their conquests in Libya, Syria, and Cyrenia.

Pleasure gardens
Beginning during the time of the New Kingdom, pleasure gardens became a common feature of luxury residences. According to paintings in tombs in Thebes from the 18th Dynasty (1552–1296 BC),  gardens of that time had a standard design. They had a pond, usually rectangular, in the center, filled with colorful fish, with lotus blossoms in the water and flowers around the edges.  Around the pond were successive rows of trees, including sycamores, palms, and grenadiers, alternating with flower beds.  The edges of the water basins were sloping, with a stairway down one side so gardeners could collect water for irrigation.

The pond was often surrounded by walls or columns supporting grapevines.  The walls and columns were decorated with colorful paintings of people, animals, and plants such as the poppy and rose.

Temple gardens

Temples often had extensive gardens.  The Temple of Amun at Karnak had twenty-six kitchen gardens, alongside a very early botanical garden, which, according to an inscription, contained "all kinds of beautiful flowers and bizarre plants which are found in the divine land which His Majesty has conquered."
The hymns painted on the walls of tombs show that religious ceremonies centered on the cycles of nature and the changing seasons.   Temple gardens often had rows of fig trees and sycamores (the tree sacred to the goddess Hathor),  tamaris, willows, or palm trees.   Rows of trees sometimes stretched for several kilometers, connecting several temples.    The temples themselves had esplanades planted with trees.   When rows of trees were planted far from the river,  wells had to be dug ten meters deep to reach water for irrigation.  During the time of Amenophis III, some temples were devoted to a goddess in the form of a tree, with a trunk for a body and branches for arms.  This goddess was believed to carry water to the dead to quench their thirst.
Temple gardens often were the homes of animals sacred to the gods, such as the ibis and the baboon.   Flowers were part of all the religious ceremonies during the time of the god Amon.
These gardens also produced medicinal herbs and spices such as cumin, marjoram, anise, and coriander.

Funeral gardens
Funeral gardens were miniature versions of house gardens that were placed in tombs. They usually had a small square house or pavilion with wooden columns, surrounded by a wall,  Within the wall was a basin surrounded by a row of trees. The house resembled the kiosks in gardens, where the owner would play checkers or relax. The dead were traditionally surrounded by the objects they would have enjoyed in life, and it was expected that they would continue to enjoy their gardens in their afterlife.   The inscription of one tomb said:  "You promenade at your ease by the lovely bank of your pond; your heart rejoices from your trees and is refreshed under your sycamores;  your heart is satisfied by the water from your wells that you made so that they would last forever."

Trees and plants in the Egyptian garden
Trees were used in the gardens to produce fruit and for shade. Nineteen different species of trees were found in the gardens of Ineni, the architect to the Pharaoh Thutmose I (1504–1492 B.C.).  The pink flowered tamarisk, acacia and willow trees were common in gardens.  The sycamore (Ficus sycomorus) and tamarisk trees were sometimes planted in front of temples, as they were at the temple of Nebhepetra, from the 11th century BC.

The ancient Egyptians cultivated Ficus sycomorus from Predynastic times, and in quantity from the start of the third millennium BCE. It was believed to be the ancient Egyptian Tree of Life, planted on the threshold between life and death. Zohary and Hopf note that "the fruit and the timber, and sometimes even the twigs, are richly represented in the tombs of the Egyptian Early, Middle and Late Kingdoms." Some of the caskets of mummies in Egypt are made from the wood of this tree.

The most common fruit trees were date palms, fig trees and doum palms (Hyphaene thebaica). The persea tree was considered sacred, and was found in both temple gardens and residential gardens. The pomegranate tree was introduced during the New Kingdom, and was prized for its aroma and color.  Other fruits grown in the gardens were jujube, olives, and peaches. Vegetables were grown for food or for ceremonies. Cos lettuce was considered sacred and was connected with Min, the deity of reproduction, and was believed to be a powerful aphrodisiac.   Grapes were used to make raisins and wine.  Tomb paintings show that grape vines were sometimes planted atop pergolas to provide shade to the garden. Flowers were raised in gardens to make decorative bouquets and for use in religious ceremonies.  Common garden flowers were the mandrake and the daisy, chrysanthemum,  anemone, and poppy, jasmine, and the rose.

Egyptian ponds and basins were often decorated white and blue lotus (Nymphaea caerulea) and with papyrus.

Ponds and pools
Ponds and pools were a common feature of the residential gardens  of the wealthy and powerful of ancient Egypt, and are shown in a number of tomb paintings.  Sometimes, as in the garden of Hatshepsut’s mortuary temple at Deir el-Bahri, the pond was in the shape of a T, with one part of the T connected to a river or canal.  The water was usually hoisted into the pond from the river by hand, or using a shadouf.  Fish for food and ornament were raised in the ponds.  They also were the home of migrating water birds.

Flowers such as white and blue lotus were grown in the ponds for decoration and for ceremonies, and papyrus was known to grow at Deir el-Bahri. Later, during the Persian occupation of Egypt, the pink lotus was introduced.

Shade, color and aroma
Shade was an important feature of the garden, provided by trees and by grapevines supported between columns.  Describing these gardens, Shaw and Nicholson wrote: "The overall effect would have been one of cool shade, heavy with the fragrance of the flowers and the trees.  Gardens are therefore one of the most frequent settings of Egyptian romantic tales."

Gardening in ancient Egypt
Gardening in ancient Egypt was very hard work;  gardens required constant irrigation, with water carried or lifted by hand,  weeding,  and tending,  including the artificial propagation of date palms, which required great skill. Great effort was also needed to keep birds from eating the crops.  Ingenious traps were set to catch the invading birds.

References

Bibliography
Ian Shaw and Paul Nicholson, The British Museum Dictionary of Ancient Egypt,  British Museum Press, 1995.
Michel Baridon, Les Jardins – Paysagistes- Jardiniers – Poetes.  Editions Robert Lafont, 1998. 
Jan Assmann, David Lorton,"Death and salvation in ancient Egypt",  Translated by David Lorton, p171, Cornell University Press, 2005, 
Daniel Zohary and Maria Hopf, Domestication of plants in the Old World, third edition (Oxford: University Press, 2000).
C. Desroches-Noblecourt,  L’Art Egyptien,  PUF, Paris, 1962.
J.C. Hugonot,  Le Jardin dans l’Egypte ancienne,  Peter Lang, Paris, 1989.

Ancient Egypt
Types of garden by country of origin